Itamaraju is a municipality in the state of Bahia in the North-East region of Brazil.  "Itamaraju" is a word from the Tupi language meaning "rock of the trees of Jucuruçu" from the terms itá (rock), mara (woods), and ju (first syllable of the Jucuruçu River).

History
On 22 April 1500 a Portuguese fleet under the command of the explorer Pedro Álvares Cabral, seen by many as the first European to arrive in Brazil, recorded their sighting of Monte Pascoal which became a European settlement and, subsequently, the municipality of Prado.  Itamaraju became and until 1961 remained a piece of the territory of Prado.  On 5 October 1961 Itamaraju formally obtained municipal autonomy, its separation from Prado led by José Gomes de Almeida and Antônio Fontes Mascarenhas.

See also
List of municipalities in Bahia

References

Municipalities in Bahia